This article lists the main modern pentathlon events and their results for 2015.

International modern pentathlon events
 July 18 & 19: 2015 Pan American Games in  Toronto
 Individual winners:  Charles Fernandez (m) /  Yane Marques (f)
 October 7 – 9: 2015 Military World Games in  Mungyeong
 Individual winners:  PARK Dong-soo (m) /  Oktawia Nowacka (f)
 Mixed Team Relay winners:  (Oktawia Nowacka & Jaroslaw Swiderski)
 Men's Team winners:  (Ilia Frolov, Sergey Karyakin, & Oleg Naumov)
 Women's Team winners:  (WANG Wei, YE Aonan, & WANG Xinyao)

World modern pentathlon events
 June 28 – July 6: 2015 World Modern Pentathlon Championships in  Berlin
 Individual winners:  Pavlo Tymoshchenko (m) /  Lena Schöneborn (f)
 Team Relay winners:  (Marvin Faly Dogue & Alexander Nobis) (m) /  (Chen Qian & LIANG Wanxia) (f)
 Mixed Team Relay winners:  (Jan Kuf & Natalie Dianová)
 Men's Team winners:  (LEE Woo-jin, JUN Woong-tae, & Jung Jin-hwa)
 Women's Team winners:  (Anna Maliszewska, Aleksandra Chmielewska, & Oktawia Nowacka)
 August 2 – 10: 2015 Junior Modern Pentathlon Championships in  Mexico City
 Junior Individual winners:  Oleg Naumov (m) /  Francesca Summers (f)
 Junior Team Relay winners:  (JUN Woong-tae & LEE Ji-hun) (m) /  (Eilidh Prise & Francesca Summers) (f)
 Junior Mixed Team Relay winners:  (LI Shuhuan & ZHONG Xiuting)
 Junior Men's Team winners:  (Oleg Naumov, Viacheslav Bardyshev, & Alexander Lifanov)
 Junior Women's Team winners:  (Ekaterina Vdovenko, Uliana Batashova, & Sofia Serkina)
 August 31 – September 7: 2015 World Youth "A" Modern Pentathlon Championships (Tetrathlon) in  Buenos Aires
 Youth Individual winners:  Serge Baranov (m) /  Ilke Ozyuksel (f)
 Youth Team Relay winners:  (Alexandr Stepachev & Serge Baranov) (m) /  (Rebecca Langrehr & Anna Matthes) (f)
 Youth Mixed Team Relay winners:  (Ahmed Hamed & Salma Abdelmaksoud)
 Youth Men's Team winners:  (SEO Chang-wan, PARK Woo-jin, & KIM Dae-won)
 Youth Women's Team winners:  (Salma Abdelmaksoud, Haydy Morsy, & Sondos Aboubakr)

Continental modern pentathlon events
 May 25 – 31: 2015 European Junior Modern Pentathlon Championships in  Sofia
 Junior Individual winners:  Sebastian Stasiak (m) /  Iryna Prasiantsova (f)
 Junior Team Relay winners:  (Oleg Naumov & Viacheslav Bardyshev) (m) /  (Rebeka Ormándi &  Karolina Palkovics)
 Junior Mixed Team Relay winners:  (Ekaterina Makarova & Nikolai Dudko)
 Junior Men's Team winners:  (Oleg Naumov, Alexander Lifanov, & Viacheslav Bardyshev)
 Junior Women's Team winners:  (Sarolta Simon, Alexandra Boros, & Anna Zs. Toth)
 May 30 – June 6: 2015 Asia-Oceania Modern Pentathlon Championships (Olympic Qualification) in  Beijing
 Individual winners:  Max Esposito (m) /  Chen Qian (f)
 Team Relay winners:  (LEE Dong-gi & Hwang Woo-jin) (m) /  (Chen Qian & LIANG Wanxia) (f)
 Mixed Team Relay winners:  (Hwang Woo-jin & Kim Sun-woo)
 Men's Team winners:  (Hwang Woo-jin, Jung Jin-hwa, & JUN Woong-tae)
 Women's Team winners:  (ZHANG Xiaonan, LIANG Wanxia, & Chen Qian)
 July 8 – 13: 2015 European Youth "A" Modern Pentathlon Championships (Tetrathlon) in  Prague
 Youth Individual winners:  Serge Baranov (m) /  Adelina Ibatullina (f)
 Youth Team Relay winners:  (Alexandr Stepachev & Serge Baranov) (m) /  (Adelina Ibatullina & Ekaterina Utina) (f)
 Youth Mixed Team Relay winners:  (Aurora Tognetti & Matteo Cicinelli)
 Youth Men's Team winners:  (Serge Baranov, Andrei Petrov, & Alexandr Stepachev)
 Youth Women's Team winners:  (Alena Shornikova, Xeina Fralcova, & Adelina Ibatullina)
 July 24 – 27: 2015 European Youth "B" Modern Pentathlon Championships (Tetrathlon) in  Caldas da Rainha
 Youth Individual winners:  Balázs Szép (m) /  Elena Micheli (f)
 Youth Team Relay winners:  (Balázs Szép & Barnabas Burcsik) (m) /  (Michelle Gulyas & Borbala Sarcia) (f)
 Youth Mixed Team Relay winners:  (Zoe Gowers & Oliver Murray)
 Youth Men's Team winners:  (Balázs Szép, Barnabas Burcsik, & Gergo Salga)
 Youth Women's Team winners:  (Virag Kiss, Michelle Gulyas, & Borbala Sarcia)
 August 17 – 23: 2015 European Modern Pentathlon Championships (Olympic Qualification) in  Bath
 Individual winners:  Arthur Lanigan-O'Keeffe (m) /  Laura Asadauskaitė (f)
 Team Relay winners:  (Yuriy Fedechko & Dmytro Kirpulyanskyy) (m) /  (Lena Schöneborn & Annika Schleu) (f)
 Mixed Team Relay winners:  (Valerio Grasselli & Camilla Lontano)
 Men's Team winners:  (Valentin Belaud, Christopher Patte, & Valentin Prades)
 Women's Team winners:  (Samantha Murray, Freyja Prentice, & Kate French)
 August 21 – 23: 2015 African Modern Pentathlon Championships (Olympic Qualification) in  Cairo
 Individual winners:  Eslam Hamad (m) /  Haydy Morsy (f)
 Men's Team winners:  (Yasser Hefny, Omar El Geziry, & Amro El Geziry)
 Women's Team winners:  (Haydy Morsy, Reem Yakout, & Sondos Aboubakr) (default)
 September 17 – 19: 2015 South American Modern Pentathlon Championships in  Resende
 Individual winners:  Esteban Bustos (m) /  Javiera Rosas (f)

2015 Modern Pentathlon World Cup
 February 18 – June 14: 2015 UIPM World Cup Schedule
 February 18 – 23: World Cup #1 in  Sarasota, Florida
 Individual winners:  James Cooke (m) /  Samantha Murray (f)
 Mixed Team Relay winners:  (Aleksander Lesun & Anna Buriak)
 March 17 – 22: World Cup #2 in  Cairo
 Individual winners:  Ruslan Nakonechnyi (m) /  Laura Asadauskaitė (f)
 Mixed Team Relay winners:  (Ismael Hernández Uscanga & Tamara Vega)
 April 8 – 13: World Cup #3 in  Rome
 Individual winners:  Pavlo Tymoshchenko (m) /  Laura Asadauskaitė (f)
 Mixed Team Relay winners:  (Hwang Woo-jin & Yang Soo-jin)
 April 30 – May 4: MP World Cup #4 in  Kecskemét
 Individual winners:  Valentin Belaud (m) /  Zsofia Foldhazi (f)
 Mixed Team Relay winners:  (Anna Zs. Toth & Adam Marosi)
 June 8 – 14: MP World Cup #5 (final) in  Minsk
 Individual winners:  Riccardo de Luca (m) /  Laura Asadauskaitė (f)
 Mixed Team Relay winners:  (Ilya Palazkov & Katsiaryna Arol)

References

External links
 Union Internationale de Pentathlon Moderne Website (UIPM)

 
Modern pentathlon
2015 in sports